"Happiness Over Everything (H.O.E.)" is a song by American singer Jhené Aiko featuring fellow American recording artists Future and Miguel. It was released on February 26, 2020 as the fourth single from Aiko's third studio album Chilombo (2020).

Composition
The song interpolates and is an ode to Jhené Aiko's 2011 song "Hoe", as well as "Where Are My Panties? (Interlude)" by André 3000, which Miguel reworks. The "sex-positive" track finds Aiko singing about not having to worry how others think of her.

Music video
The music video premiered on February 27, 2020. In it, Jhené Aiko is at a luau-themed party with friends and family. Her sister Mila J, mother, and father appear in the video.

Charts

Certifications

References

2020 singles
2020 songs
Jhené Aiko songs
Future (rapper) songs
Miguel (singer) songs
Songs written by Jhené Aiko
Songs written by Future (rapper)
Songs written by Miguel (singer)
Songs written by André 3000
Def Jam Recordings singles